Brossasco is a comune (municipality) in the Province of Cuneo in the Italian region of Piedmont, located about  southwest of Turin and about  northwest of Cuneo.

Brossasco borders the following municipalities: Frassino, Gambasca, Isasca, Martiniana Po, Melle, Sampeyre, Sanfront, Busca and Venasca.

References 

Cities and towns in Piedmont